Chuck Rodee (born Charles J. Rodeghier September 8, 1927 – May 14, 1966) was an American racecar driver who died while attempting to qualify for the 1966 Indianapolis 500.

Midget car racing career
Rodee won the Fort Wayne Indoor midget car title in 1955 at the 1/10 mile cement track, and finished third in the USAC National Midget championship. He repeated with Fort Wayne championships in 1957 and 1958. He collected his fourth track championship in 1966 before his death. He finished second in the 1956 USAC National Midget points, and third in 1965.

Championship car career
He drove in the USAC Championship Car series, racing in the 1957, 1958, 1960, and 1962-1965 seasons. He finished in the top ten 4 times, with his best finish in 5th position in 1965 at Atlanta. He had 16 career starts, including the Indianapolis 500 races in 1962 and 1965. He finished in 32nd in 1962 after crashing to avoid Jack Turner, and 28th in 1965.

Death
Rodee died while attempting to qualify for the 1966 Indianapolis 500. He spun on a second lap warm-up and backed the car into the wall exiting Turn 1. The impact appeared minor but the rigid chassis transferred virtually the entire force of the crash to the driver. Rodee suffered a ruptured aorta and lapsed into a coma. He was pronounced dead after emergency surgery failed to save him.

Career award
He was inducted in the National Midget Auto Racing Hall of Fame.

Indy 500 results

See also

List of Indianapolis fatalities

References

External links
 

1927 births
1966 deaths
Burials in Indiana
Indianapolis 500 drivers
Sportspeople from Cook County, Illinois
Racing drivers from Illinois
Racing drivers who died while racing
Sports deaths in Indiana